The Belgian State Railways was the original state-owned railway of Belgium. Established by an organic law of 1 May 1834, it began construction of its first line, between Brussels and Mechelen on 1 June 1834. This line, which was opened on 5 May 1835, was also the first steam-powered public railway in continental Europe.

On 1 September 1926, the assets and operations of the Belgian State Railways were transferred to its successor, the then newly created National Railway Company of Belgium ((NMBS/SNCB)), as part of a scheme formulated to eliminate Belgium's then excessive floating debt.  Under the scheme, it was intended that Treasury bonds would not be repaid when they fell due; instead, they would be converted into bonds or shares issued by the NMBS/SNCB, or into fresh Treasury bonds, with the holders having the right to take either.

See also

History of rail transport in Belgium
Rail transport in Belgium
Train World

References

Railway companies of Belgium
Railway companies established in 1834
Railway companies disestablished in 1926
1834 establishments in Belgium
1926 disestablishments in Belgium